Omar Wahrouch (19261994) was a Moroccan singer-poet (ṛṛays) and songwriter. He wrote and sang in Tashelhit.

Biography 
Omar Wahrouch was born in a small town near Imintanoute in the region of Marrakesh, Morocco. The date of his birth is contested between 1926 and 1933 due to the uncommon recording of births in that period. He was influenced by his father who was also a musician (rayss) and taught him the skills of playing Rebab and poetry.

His official start was in 1952 when he performed in public with the song "The Officer" about French colonialism which led to his imprisonment for three months.

After Moroccan Independence, he continued performing in national and international festivals and concerts. He performed in France in 1963 and Belgium in 1964 before going for pilgrimage in 1968. He became famous in the 1970s for his songs about nationalism, colonialism, poverty, oppression, and social problems.

Omar's last known recording was in 1987 before his mental illness that led him to a psychiatric hospital in 1991. He stayed there for one year and came back home in his village where he died on 27 October 1994.

Legacy 
Omar Wahrouch wrote several poems and songs about social, cultural, and political topics. Some of his famous poems and songs are:

 Titbirine (Doves)
 The Officer
 Imehssaden (The Jealous)
 Ifarkhane N Ait Omarg (Children of musicians)

See also 
 Mohamed Demsiri
 Said Achtouk

References 

1926 births
1994 deaths
20th-century Moroccan poets
20th-century Moroccan male singers
Moroccan songwriters
Berber poets
Berber musicians
Shilha people